Finsbury Park is a bus station in Finsbury Park, in Islington, London, England, served by several local bus routes. The bus station is next to Finsbury Park London Underground and National Rail station, collectively called Finsbury Park Interchange.

Layout
The bus station has two parts: Wells Terrace, at the north of the station complex (stops A, B and C) and Station Place, to the east (stops G, H and rail replacement services).

The bus station has six stands in total. The main operators at the bus station include Tower Transit, Arriva London, Metroline and CT Plus.

See also
List of bus and coach stations in London

Bus stations in London
Transport in the London Borough of Islington